Price Terrace is a relatively level ice-free area (c. 1 square mile) between LaBelle Valley and Berkey Valley in the Cruzen Range of Victoria Land. The terrace rises to 1250 m, about 750 m above Barwick Valley close southward. Named by the Advisory Committee on Antarctic Names in 2005 after P. Buford Price, Physics Department, University of California, Berkeley, a United States Antarctic Program principal investigator for cosmic ray studies near McMurdo Station in 1989, and neutrino astrophysics research at Amundsen–Scott South Pole Station in 1991.

References

Landforms of Victoria Land